The men's moguls event in freestyle skiing at the 1994 Winter Olympics in Lillehammer took place from 15 to 16 February at Kanthaugen Freestyle Arena.

Results

Qualification
The top 16 advanced to the final.

Final

References

External links
Sports-Reference - 1994 Men's Moguls

Men's freestyle skiing at the 1994 Winter Olympics